Rozaimie bin Rahim (born 6 November 1984) is a Malaysian professional footballer who plays as a goalkeeper for Malaysia Super League club Sabah.

References

1984 births
Living people
Malaysian footballers
People from Pahang
Sabah F.C. (Malaysia) players
Kuala Lumpur City F.C. players
Association football goalkeepers